was the 8th daimyō of Hirosaki Domain in northern Mutsu Province, Honshū, Japan (modern-day Aomori Prefecture). His courtesy title was Tosa-no-kami, and his Court rank was Junior Fifth Rank, Lower Grade.

Biography
Tsugaru Nobuyasu was the eldest son of Tsugaru Nobuyasu, 7th daimyō of Hirosaki Domain. In 1776, he was received in formal audience by shōgun Tokugawa Ieharu and succeeded his father in 1784. Noted for his intelligence and learning at an early age, he corresponded with a number of other daimyō  noted for their good government, including Hosokawa Shigekata of Kumamoto Domain, Uesugi Harunori of Yonezawa Domain and Matsudaira Sadanobu of Shirakawa Domain. Nobuakira inherited a domain stricken by extensive famine caused by repeated natural disasters and mismanagement. Domain records indicate that 130,000 peasants perished during the Great Tenmei Famine alone, while corrupt senior officials during his father's reign had been selling of all of the domain's rice reserves for their personal profit to merchants in Edo. Nobuyasu soon took steps to restore the domain's finances, promote new industries and the development of new crops, and to reign in the worst excesses of his senior retainers. One of his reforms was to implement a new land survey, the first in over 200 years in the domain, to reassess taxable income and to permit farmers to exchange exhausted lands for new farmland. However, these reforms sparked considerable opposition within the domain's vested interests, and Nobuakira’s sudden and unexpected death at the age of 28 may have been by poisoning. As Nobuakira died without an heir, the next daimyō of Hirosaki Domain, Tsugaru Yasuchika was the son of Tsugaru Akitaka, from the clan's subsidiary holding in Kuroishi.

His grave is at the clan temple of Shinryō-in (a subsidiary of Kan'ei-ji) in Taitō-ku, Tokyo.

See also
Tsugaru clan

References 
 "Hirosaki-jō" (February 17, 2008)
 "Tsugaru-han" on Edo 300 HTML (February 17, 2008)
Koyasu Nobushige (1880). Buke kazoku meiyoden 武家家族名誉伝 Volume 1. Tokyo: Koyasu Nobushige. (Accessed from National Diet Library, July 17, 2008)
 Kurotaki, Jūjirō (1984). Tsugaru-han no hanzai to keibatsu 津軽藩の犯罪と刑罰. Hirosaki: Hoppō shinsha.
 Narita, Suegorō (1975). Tsugaru Tamenobu: shidan 津軽為信: 史談. Aomori: Tōō Nippōsha.
 Tsugaru Tsuguakira Kō Den kankōkai (1976). Tsugaru Tsuguakira kō-den 津輕承昭公傳. Tokyo: Rekishi Toshosha
 The content of much of this article was derived from that of the corresponding article on Japanese Wikipedia.

Tozama daimyo
Tsugaru clan
1762 births
1791 deaths
People of Edo-period Japan